The Package is a 2018 American teen comedy film directed by Jake Szymanski from a screenplay by Kevin Burrows and Matt Mider. The film stars Daniel Doheny, Sadie Calvano, Geraldine Viswanathan, Luke Spencer Roberts, and Eduardo Franco.

Plot
Returning home from Germany, Sean Floyd plans to go to the woods for spring break with his friends Jeremy Abelar and Donnie. Unbeknownst to Sean or Donnie, Jeremy has invited his younger sister, Becky, who recently broke up with her boyfriend Chad, and her friend Sarah, who Donnie used to date. Donnie and Jeremy encourage Sean to make a move on Becky, whom he has a crush on. Jeremy assures the group that the trip is safe, while the rest worry as it took them 6 hours to reach their destination. Arriving at the campsite, Sean attempts to make a move on Becky but is interrupted by Donnie, who takes him along to pester a peeing Jeremy. Because of them startling him while he's playing with a knife, Jeremy accidentally cuts off his own penis. Sean takes everyone's phones to find an area with service and calls 9-1-1. He also angrily texts Chad from Becky's phone, before accidentally losing all the phones. Paramedics arrive in a helicopter, and Sean gives them a cooler containing Jeremy's penis.

After the paramedics leave, the group finds the penis in a different cooler and realize that Sean gave the paramedics the wrong cooler. At the hospital, the nurse reveals the dilemma to Jeremy, who is distraught due to the fact that she does not have any faith in the group. Having gotten lost in the woods trying to find their car, the group finds a radio tower. Believing they can send someone a signal, they go inside and find a rattlesnake. Startled, Becky tosses the cooler towards it, and the snake bites the penis. After Sean has sucked out the venom, Sarah discovers a drone secretly following them and chases it, but falls into water at the bottom of a ravine. The rest follow, and they swim across the ravine and find the owner of the drone, a foul-mouthed 11-year-old boy out camping with his dad. He tries to bribe Sarah and Becky into scissoring in front of him in exchange for the keys to his dad's boat. Becky and Sean scare him by talking about penises being cut off, allowing the group to steal the boat, although they are attacked by his dad, who thinks the group molested his son.

They find their car and head to a gas station where Jeremy had previously bought booze using his fake soldier ID. The gas station clerk cleans the penis as an act of patriotism. Afterwards, he sees Donnie's high school ID and realizes they lied about being soldiers - he chases their car as they escape and hits Donnie in the shoulder with an arrow through his headboard. They head to the hospital and give the penis to the doctors. After the surgery, they head inside Jeremy's room to find a different man named Reginald, and realize there was a misunderstanding and Jeremy's penis was put on Reginald instead. In a heated argument, Donnie tells Becky about Sean texting Chad from her phone. She calls Chad to pick her up, and Sean and Donnie visit Reginald, who is now awake. They explain the situation and Reginald tells them how his girlfriend cut off his penis as revenge for him cheating with her sister. The doctor tells Sean and Donnie to go get Reginald's penis, which was just found and turned in, with the hopes of attaching it to Jeremy. However, Reginald's girlfriend suddenly comes to visit and ends up cutting off his penis again. Sean and Donnie fight her and retrieve Jeremy's penis. They meet up with Becky and Sarah, and Sean apologizes to Becky and tells her she shouldn't be with someone who cheated on her. She accepts the apology and the four of them leave together.

After figuring out that the hospital had likely registered Jeremy under the name on his fake ID, they call the first hospital they had visited and finally deliver Jeremy's penis. While Jeremy is in surgery, Donnie and Sarah reconcile and decide to give their relationship another chance. Becky and Sean apologize to each other and start a relationship.

When Sean is about to return to Germany, Jeremy is released from the hospital and introduces his girlfriend, Kendall Jenners, whom the rest believed was fake after he repeatedly mentioned her throughout the trip. Donnie and Sarah rekindle their relationship and, with everyone goading them, Becky and Sean share a long kiss.

Cast 
 Daniel Doheny as Sean Floyd
 Geraldine Viswanathan as Becky Abelar
 Sadie Calvano as Sarah
 Luke Spencer Roberts as Donnie
 Eduardo Franco as Jeremy Abelar
 Alexander Calvert as Chad
 Blake Anderson as Redneck Reginald
 Sugar Lyn Beard as Sheryl
 Mary Holland as Triage Nurse
 Christian Convery as Jake Floyd
 Jake Szymanski as Wastewater Worker
 Veena Sood as Mrs. Abelar
 Michael Eklund as Gas Station clerk
 Jade Falcon as Kendall Jenners
 Gary Jones as Dr. Trimble

Production
In January 2017, it was reported that Netflix had won a bidding war for the spec script for the film, then titled Eggplant Emoji, by Kevin Burrows and Matt Mider. In July 2017, it was announced that Jake Szymanski would direct, and in August 2017, Daniel Doheny, Sadie Calvano, Geraldine Viswanathan, Luke Spencer Roberts, and Eduardo Franco joined the cast. The film was later re-titled The Package.

Release and reception
The Package was released on August 10, 2018 on Netflix.

The website's critics consensus reads, "The Package learns the hard way that a penis joke does not make a movie."

References

External links
 
 

American black comedy films
English-language Netflix original films
Red Hour Productions films
Films produced by Ben Stiller
2010s English-language films
Films directed by Jake Szymanski
2010s American films